Deluge is a 1933 American apocalyptic science fiction film, directed by Felix E. Feist, and released by RKO Radio Pictures.
 
The film is very loosely based on the 1928 novel of the same name by S. Fowler Wright, with the setting changed from the United Kingdom to the United States. It follows a small group of survivors after a series of unexplained natural disasters erupt around the world and destroy  civilization, including a massive tsunami which inundates New York City.

Plot
Scientists discover that a violent storm is heading toward New York City and begin the warning process throughout the city. They believe that something is wrong with the natural barometer patterns and that an unprecedented event is imminent. A sudden eclipse of the sun verifies their speculations, and it seems that global destruction is near. Telegraph messages from Rome and London explain days of unending earthquakes and state "The End of the World is at Hand". Tremendous earthquakes hit the Pacific Coast, killing millions, and it is reported that the entire west coast of the U.S. has been destroyed. The earthquakes have also caused major tsunamis in the world's oceans and disaster is just moments away.

Martin Webster and his wife Helen prepare for the oncoming disaster by gathering their children and some essentials and head for a high rock formation to escape the floods. Martin leaves Helen and goes back to the house to get more food and clothes, but the destruction of New York begins. Buildings crumble from earthquakes and large tsunami waters envelop the city. Martin returns to find his wife and daughters are nowhere to be found. In the aftermath, grief-stricken Martin builds a shelter and tries to survive on his own.

Surviving in a cabin on the outskirts of in another part of the New York City, two men, Jepson and Norwood, find Claire unconscious, washed up on the shore outside their cabin. As she recovers, the men start feuding  and become very possessive. When she is attacked, Claire flees across the water (she is a world-class swimmer), leaving the men angry and vengeful. Jepson kills Norwood and begins to search for her, vowing to bring her back.

Claire washes up on another shore, where Martin finds her. Martin and Claire become good friends and eventually fall in love. Meanwhile, in a nearby town, survivors have gathered together to start civilization again. Among the survivors is Martin's wife, Helen, and their two children. Tom, one of the townsmen, found Helen in the aftermath, and has been taking care of her ever since. He has also fallen in love with her, but Helen is convinced that her husband is still alive.

Jepson teams up with the Bellamy gang, who eventually find Claire and Martin, and trap them in a tunnel. The townspeople stumble upon this situation and save Martin and Claire and bring them back to their new city. Once they arrive, Martin finds his children and discovers that his wife is alive and well and goes to her. As a result, Claire and Tom are devastated.

Following the reunion, Martin explains to Claire how he is in love with both his wife and with her and that he will not choose. Helen visits Claire and they have a painful discussion in which Claire says she will not give up Martin. However, when Claire sees Martin with his wife at the town meeting, her heart breaks and she runs to the ocean, where she swims away. Martin is left on shore watching her go.

Cast
 Peggy Shannon as Claire
 Sidney Blackmer as Martin 
 Lois Wilson as Helen 
 Matt Moore as Tom 
 Fred Kohler as Jepson 
 Ralf Harolde as Norwood
 Edward Van Sloan as Prof. Carlysle
 Samuel Hinds as Chief Forecaster

Production notes
The film opens with a quote from the Bible's Book of Genesis, Chapter 9, verse 11: "And I shall establish my covenant with you; neither shall all flesh be cut off any more by the waters of the flood; neither shall there any more be a flood to destroy the earth."

S. Fowler Wright, the author of the 1928 novel upon which the film was based, began pitching a script based on the book to studios in 1933. In May, he accepted an offer from Worldwide Studios for $5,000 for the options. Wright's script for a film version was not used. The independent, Admiral/K.B.S. Productions, produced the film with a budget of $171,000, equivalent to approximately 3.51 million in 2020. Wright later watched the final scenes being shot and was disappointed to learn that producers had made changes and chose to not use the ending of the book as the film's ending. He later wrote in his diary that he felt the film was "ghastly" and advised his children not to see it.

While Deluge was the first film to visualize the total destruction of New York City, it was filmed entirely in Los Angeles. Many films have since continued to use New York as the center for their apocalyptic and post-apocalyptic storylines. A scene in Deluge that features a tidal wave that leaves New York submerged in water with nearly all inhabitants drowned, would later be recreated in the 2004 disaster film The Day After Tomorrow.

The special effects were done by Ned Mann, Russell E. Lawson, and Billy Williams. Mann later worked on the H. G. Wells-scripted film Things to Come (1936).

Part of the stock footage of ships and planes returning to port under severe storm warnings includes actual footage of the large U.S. Navy rigid airship USS Macon (ZRS-5), which would later be lost at sea in 1935.

Reception
Deluge received mixed but mostly positive reviews upon its release. It was a modest hit for RKO.

Preservation status
Republic Pictures later bought the film for just its special effects footage, 
using some of the scenes of destruction  in S.O.S. Tidal Wave (1939), Dick Tracy vs Crime Inc (1941), and King of the Rocket Men (1949).

For many years, Deluge was considered a lost film. In 1981, Forrest J Ackerman discovered a print, dubbed in Italian (La distruzione del mondo), in a film archive in Italy.

Kansas City film distributor and film collector Wade Williams actually discovered an Italian-language nitrate film print in the basement of an old mansion in Rome in 1981. It belonged to Williams' friend and Italian film producer Luigi Cozzi (aka Lewis Coates). Forry Ackerman, his wife Wyndane, and Wade Williams were guest speakers at a science fiction festival in Rome. Forry Ackerman verified it was a lost film in the U.S. After Williams bought the access rights, he made a dupe preservation negative and 35mm print. It was subtitled in English for its first VHS release by Englewood Entertainment. The 35mm print was re-released theatrically and played at the Film Forum in New York City and at other revival houses and archives.

A 35mm nitrate dupe negative with its original English soundtrack was discovered in 2016. A 2K restoration scan was made by Lobster Films. This restoration was picked up for a limited theatrical re-release by Kino Repertory. A home media blu-ray release by Kino Lorber Studio Classics appeared in February 2017.

See also
List of apocalyptic films
List of rediscovered films
List of incomplete or partially lost films

References

External links

1933 films
1930s disaster films
1930s independent films
1930s rediscovered films
1930s science fiction drama films
American black-and-white films
American disaster films
American independent films
American post-apocalyptic films
American science fiction drama films
Films based on British novels
Films based on science fiction novels
Films directed by Felix E. Feist
Films produced by Samuel Bischoff
Films set in New York City
Films shot in Los Angeles
Flood films
Rediscovered American films
RKO Pictures films
1930s English-language films
1930s American films